Aptinothrips is a genus of insects belonging to the family Thripidae.

The species of this genus are found in Europe, Australia and Northern America.

Species:
 Aptinothrips elegans Priesner, 1924 
 Aptinothrips karnyi John, 1927

References

Thripidae
Thrips genera